Easy Action is a Swedish band from Stockholm that was first formed in 1981 by Pelle Almgren (ex-Warhead), Henrik "2 meter" Jermsten (ex-Stoodes), Bosse Belsen (aka Zinny J. Zan of Shotgun Messiah/Kingpin/Zan Clan – drums) and Björne Fröberg (bass, ex-Warhead). Bosse and Björne quit and were replaced by Ola "Skox" Andersson and drummer Urban "Ubbe" Sundbaum (ex-Lustans Lakejer). Stranded Records became interested and released the single "Honcho Bongo". It did not sell well and when the second single, "Om jag vore kung", also failed the band split up. Skox and 2 meter formed Psyhedelic Mongo and Pelle Almgren started writing songs instead.

Easy Action was reformed as a glam metal band in 1982 by Kee Marcello and Alex Tyrone (aka Peo Thyrén). The two played together in the Swedish glam act Noice when they decided to start the ultimate glam rock band, mixing their influences of 1970s glam with a punk/metal attitude.  They met the original singer Bosse Belsen, now named Zinny J. Zan, at the Stockholm rock club Ritz and recorded his vocals on the first demos the same night.  Later the Noice drummer Fredrik Von Gerber and the guitar player Danny Wilde joined the band, followed by bassist, Per-Olof Thyrén.

In 1983, they got signed to the US major label Sire and became the first Swedish band ever to sign a worldwide record deal.
After releasing two albums; Easy Action in 1983, and That Makes One in 1986, the band split up when their guitarist and band leader Kee Marcello quit the band to join Europe, and went on to worldwide success with the band, selling over 30 million albums. Zinny J. Zan went on to join the Skövde glam metal band Kingpin, later renamed Shotgun Messiah.

Poison used the chorus of Easy Action's 1983 single "We Go Rocking" in their hit single "I Want Action", which led to the members of Easy Action suing the American band and winning a financial settlement in the case.

Easy Action reunited for a gig at the Sweden Rock Festival in 2006. This was followed by several shows in late 2007, including opening for Twisted Sister. In April 2008, the band went in the studio with producer Chris Laney to record a new studio album. In 2011, bassist Micael Grimm died.

On 18 December 2018, Easy Action was confirmed to play at the Sweden Rock Festival in 2019. The concert included a live performance of the album That Makes One in its entirety, performed by the line-up that recorded it, including vocalist Tommy Nilsson and guitarists Kee Marcello and Chris Lind.

Personnel

Current line-up 
Kee Marcello – guitar (1981–1986, 2006–2011, 2019-present)
Chris Lind – guitar (1984–1988, 2019-present)
Tommy Nilsson – vocals (1985–1988, 2019-present)
Björn Påhlsson – bass (1985–1988, 2019-present)
"Grizzly" Höglund – drums (2006–2011, 2019-present)
Jöregen Ingeström – keyboards (live only) (1985–1988, 2019-present)

Former members 
Björne Fröberg – guitar (1981–1982)
Pelle Almgren – vocals(1981–1982)
Henrik "2 meter" Jermsten – guitar (1981–1982)
Ola "Skox" Andersson – bass (1981–1982)
Urban "Ubbe" Sundbaum – drums (1981–1982)
Zinny J. Zan – vocals (1981–1985, 2006–2011)
Danny Wilde – guitar (1982–1984)
Alex Tyrone – bass (1982–1985)
Freddie Von Gerber – drums (1982–1988)
Gunnar Hallin – guitar (1987–1988)
Micael Grimm – bass (2006–2011)
Simon Roxx – guitar (2006–2011)

Discography

Studio albums 
Easy Action (1983)
That Makes One (1986)

Singles 
"Honcho Bongo" (1982)
"Om jag vore kung" (1982)
"We Go Rocking" (1983)
"The End of the Line" (1983)
"Round Round Round" (1984)

See also 
List of glam metal bands and artists

References

External links 
Easy Action on MySpace
Tartarean Desire – Easy Action

Musical groups established in 1981
Musical groups from Stockholm
Swedish glam metal musical groups